The Preobrazhenovskoye mine is a large mine located in the south-eastern Russia in Primorsky Krai. Preobrazhenovskoye represents one of the largest fluorite reserves in Russia having estimated reserves of 14.9 million tonnes of ore grading 6.22% fluorite.

References 

Fluorite mines in Russia